The Small European Postal Administration Cooperation (SEPAC; also "...Cooperations"; also Small European Postal Administrations Cooperation) is an association of 13 European postal authorities: Åland, the Faroe Islands, Gibraltar, Greenland, Guernsey, Iceland, the Isle of Man, Jersey, Liechtenstein, Luxembourg, Malta, Monaco, and Vatican City. Luxembourg was not originally a member of SEPAC but it joined at the end of 2006. San Marino  decided to leave and is no longer a member, as of March 2020. SEPAC is smaller than PostEurop. 

The first joint issue of SEPAC postage stamps occurred on October 1, 2007, and the next in 2009; the sixth one was in September 2015. San Marino and Vatican City do not participate in these issues.

The following criteria are requisites for membership:
 The postal administration must be located in Europe. 
 The postal administration must be independent. 
 The postal administration must have a small market with more than 50% of its philatelic customers living outside the country.

The Secretary of SEPAC is Andrée Valentine, Jersey Post's Head of Philatelic Services.

Member organisations

Common theme issues of SEPAC

References

External links
Official Website   
 SEPAC 2009 stamps - Beautiful Corners of Europe